Jens Ernst Wegener (5 October 1781 - 15 October 1846) was a Danish educator and pedagogical writer. He was principal of Jonstrup Seminarium outside Copenhagen from 1819- to 1838. He was the father of painter Gustav Theodor Wegener.

Early life and education
Wegener was born in Odense, the son of Casper Frederich Wegener and Maren Jensdatter Staal. He later moved to Copenhagen.

Career
Wegener succeeded Jacob Saxtorph as principal of Jonstrup Seminarium in 1819. He retired in 1838. Hans Christian Andersen mentions him in Mit livs rejse.

Family
Wegener married Birgitte Maria Bindesbøll (17971856), a sister of the architect Michael Gottlieb Bindesbøll. They had four children: Karen Johanne Juliane Wegener, Gustav Theodor Wegener, Marie Sophie Lovise Lund and Jacobe Henriette Catharina Wegener. His daughter Johanne (Hanne) was married to the paper merchant and art collector Wilhelm Wanscher.

References

Rxternal links

 Jens Ernst Wegener at geni.com
 Letter to Hans Christian Andersen

19th-century Danish educators
19th-century Danish writers
19th-century male writers
People from Odense
1781 births
1846 deaths